A list of films produced in France in 1970.

Notes

External links
 French films of 1970 at the Internet Movie Database
French films of 1970 at Cinema-francais.fr

1970
Films
French